Winfred George Knoch (May 24, 1895 – May 23, 1983) was a United States circuit judge of the United States Court of Appeals for the Seventh Circuit and previously was a United States district judge of the United States District Court for the Northern District of Illinois.

Education and career

Born in Naperville, Illinois, Knoch received a Bachelor of Laws from DePaul University College of Law in 1917. He immediately entered private practice in Naperville, but served as a lieutenant in the United States Army infantry during World War I, from 1917 to 1919. He then returned to private practice until 1930, also serving as an assistant state's attorney of DuPage County, Illinois from 1922 to 1930. He was a Judge in DuPage County from 1930 to 1939, and on the 16th Judicial Circuit Court of Illinois from 1939 to 1953.

Federal judicial service

Knoch was nominated by President Dwight D. Eisenhower on April 27, 1953, to the United States District Court for the Northern District of Illinois, to a new seat authorized by 64 Stat. 443. He was confirmed by the United States Senate on May 13, 1953, and received his commission the next day. His service terminated on September 14, 1958, due to his elevation to the Seventh Circuit.

Knoch was nominated by President Eisenhower on August 16, 1958, to a seat on the United States Court of Appeals for the Seventh Circuit vacated by Judge Walter C. Lindley. He was confirmed by the Senate on August 19, 1958, and received commission on August 21, 1958. He assumed senior status on December 4, 1967. His service terminated on May 23, 1983, due to his death.

References

Sources
 

1895 births
1983 deaths
American people of German descent
Illinois state court judges
Judges of the United States District Court for the Northern District of Illinois
United States district court judges appointed by Dwight D. Eisenhower
Judges of the United States Court of Appeals for the Seventh Circuit
United States court of appeals judges appointed by Dwight D. Eisenhower
20th-century American judges
DePaul University College of Law alumni
United States Army officers